Pedro Costa (born 30 December 1958) is a Portuguese film director. He is best known for his sequence of films set in Lisbon, which focuses on the lives of the impoverished residents of a slum in the Fontainhas neighbourhood.

Biography
After completing a degree in history from the University of Lisbon, Costa worked as an assistant for Jorge Silva Melo, Vítor Gonçalves and João Botelho. He released his debut film O Sangue at the age of 30.

Costa's films would receive acclaim from critics consistently throughout his career. He collected the France Culture Award (Foreign Cineaste of the Year) at 2002 Cannes Film Festival for directing In Vanda's Room. Colossal Youth was selected for the 2006 Cannes Film Festival and earned the Independent/Experimental prize (Los Angeles Film Critics Association) in 2008. Horse Money was awarded the Leopard for Best Director in 2014, while his Vitalina Varela was awarded the Gold Leopard for Best Film in 2019.

Style and influences
He is considered to be part of "The School of Reis" film family. António Reis, Portuguese director, was his teacher at the Lisbon Theatre and Film School. 

His menteeship under directors Straub–Huillet was explored in his 2001 documentary "Where Does Your Hidden Smile Lie?".  
  
Stephen Whitty of Screen Daily described Costa's films as "lit like a Rembrandt, [and] acted like a neo-realist classic." He is acclaimed for using his ascetic style to depict marginalised people, often non-actors playing themselves, in desperate living situations. Shot on digital video and making use of non-actors, Costa's early works have been called examples of docufiction. Although continuing to collaborate with non-actors in his later works, he would gradually transition away from the low-resolution documentary style into what critic Armond White characterised as "museum-quality compositions".

Fontainhas sequence 
From the release of Ossos onwards, Costa's films have been entirely set in Fontainhas, a slum neighbourhood on the outskirts of Lisbon. His subjects, immigrants and the socially disadvantaged, feature as recurring characters throughout the sequence. One notable example is the character of Ventura, protagonist of both Colossal Youth and Horse Money.

Filmography

Features
 O Sangue (1989)
 Casa de Lava (1994)
 Ossos (1997)
 In Vanda's Room (2000)
 Colossal Youth (2006)
 Horse Money (2014)
 Vitalina Varela (2019)

Documentaries and shorts
 Where Does Your Hidden Smile Lie? (2001) (documentary)
 State of the World (2007) - "Tarrafal" segment (short)
 Memories (2007) - "The Rabbit Hunters" segment (short)
 Change Nothing (2009) (documentary)

Plays
 The Daughters of Fire (2016)

See also
 Docufiction
 Ethnofiction
 List of directors associated with art film

References

Further reading 
 Malte Hagener / Tina Kaiser (ed.), Pedro Costa. Film-Konzepte 41 (edition text + kritik, 2016).
 Fajgenbaum, Emma, Cinema as Disquiet - The Ghostly Realism of Pedro Costa, New Left Review 116, London (June 2019).

External links
 

1958 births
Living people
Portuguese film directors
People from Lisbon
University of Lisbon alumni
Portuguese-language film directors
Lisbon Theatre and Film School alumni